The 1993–94 Missouri Tigers men's basketball team represented the University of Missouri as a member of the Big Eight Conference during the 1993–94 NCAA men's basketball season. Led by head coach Norm Stewart, the Tigers won the Big Eight Conference regular season title by sweeping through the league schedule. Though upset by Nebraska in the Big Eight tournament semifinals, the Tigers were awarded the #1 seed in the West region of the NCAA tournament. After reaching the Elite Eight, Arizona defeated the Tigers 92–72 in the regional final. Missouri finished with an overall record of 28–4 (14–0 Big Eight).

Roster

Schedule and results

 
|-
!colspan=9 style=| Regular season

|-
!colspan=9 style=| Big Eight tournament

|-
!colspan=9 style=| NCAA Tournament

Rankings

Awards
Melvin Booker – Big Eight Player of the Year, First-team All-Big Eight, Consensus Second-team All-American

References

Missouri
Missouri
Missouri Tigers men's basketball seasons